Bernard Allen may refer to:

Bernard Allen (U.S. politician) (1937–2006), Democratic member of the North Carolina General Assembly
Bernard Allen (Irish politician) (born 1944), former Irish Fine Gael politician
Bernie Allen (born 1939), Major League Baseball player

See also
Allen (surname)